David Earle Bailey (born 1940) is bishop of the Episcopal Church in Navajoland, a mission area of the Episcopal Church. He was consecrated bishop on August 7, 2010.

Bailey was ordained to the priesthood in 1980 and received an MDiv from the Episcopal Seminary of the Southwest. He had previously served as rector of St. Stephen's Episcopal Church in Phoenix, Arizona, and as canon to the ordinary and development director in the Episcopal Diocese of Utah.

Consecrated bishop at age 70, he is the second oldest person to be made a bishop in the Episcopal Church and the first septuagenarian since the eighteenth-century.

References 

Living people
1940 births
Episcopal bishops of Navajoland